Clinton Leeuw (born 15 April 1982 in Cape Town) is a professional squash player who represents South Africa. He reached a career-high world ranking of World No. 79 in May 2013.

References

External links 
 
 
 

South African male squash players
Living people
1982 births
Sportspeople from Cape Town
21st-century South African people